"Wizboy " is the second episode of the first season of the animated television series Fanboy & Chum Chum. It premiered on November 6, 2009 as the series premiere along with Trading Day on Nickelodeon. The episode was written by Steve Tompkins and directed by Jim Schumann.

Synopsis
Fanboy (voiced by David Hornsby) and his best friend Chum Chum (voiced by Nika Futterman) meet the new kid, Kyle (voiced by Jamie Kennedy), who was recently expelled from Milkweed Academy for Wizards. The boys pretend to be wizards like Kyle, but he gets annoyed by them and tries to destroy them.

Plot
Fanboy and Chum Chum are in their regular class until a new kid at their school shows up. His name is Kyle, but no one catches his attention yet. After he arrives, Kyle sits on his own up front, but Fanboy and Chum Chum scoot up next to him. They quickly find Kyle as a pretend wizard, despite the fact he really is one. So, Fanboy pretends to be one named "Wizboy", and Chum Chum pretends to be his assistant. Kyle soon finds that Fanboy and Chum Chum are acting like wizards, and is annoyed. At lunch, they annoy him more by pretending to levitate ketchup. Kyle shows them real levitation, surprising them, but accidentally descends into a lunch tray, which causes him to get hurt by Lupe, one of the students. So, Kyle eventually challenges Fanboy to a "wizard-off". During that, Fanboy performs a "removed finger" trick, causing a dumbstruck Chum Chum to faint to the ground. Fanboy gives Chum Chum an Ice Monster Bun Bun to wake him up, but he sticks himself to Fanboy's head, and they hop around, madly. For Kyle, he thinks this is a target, and he is ready to win. But before he was going to destroy Fanboy he eventually is taken by a griffin (because of a spell Fanboy cast from Kyle's spellbook at lunch earlier), and flies away on it. Fanboy and Chum Chum do not see this, thinking he left, and Fanboy apologizes for being more awesome. To make it up, he says they will play wizard with Kyle all day tomorrow, thinking he'll like that. As they walk home, Kyle can be heard in the distance, saying "No, I won't!"

Production and Broadcast
Wizboy was written by Steve Tompkins and directed by Jim Schumann with storyboards by Andy Kelly.  The episode carried a TV-Y7 rating. It originally aired on November 6, 2009, after the world premiere of SpongeBob's Truth or Square.

Reception
The episode drew over 5.78 million viewers and 2.5 million kids 6-11. This episode set a new record as Nickelodeon's highest-rated series premiere ever with kids 6-11 and 2-11.

References

External links

2009 American television episodes